Lycée Français Louis-Charles Damais, also known as the Lycée international français de Jakarta (LIF Jakarta), is a French international school in Jakarta, Indonesia.

It serves levels preschool (maternelle) through high school (lycée).

References

External links

 Lycée Français Louis-Charles Damais
 Lycée Français Louis-Charles Damais 

Jakarta
International schools in Jakarta
Educational institutions established in 1967
1967 establishments in Indonesia